The Polytechnic State University of Bicol, also referred to by its acronym (PSUB), is a state university in the Bicol Region, Philippines. It is mandated primarily to provide higher technological, professional and vocational instruction and training in fisheries, trade, technology, arts and sciences, as well as short term technical and vocational courses, as the Board of Trustees may deem necessary, and shall promote research in the exploration and conservation of natural resources in the province. Its main campus is located in Nabua, Camarines Sur.

History

Conception 
Polytechnic State University of Bicol was born out of the Camarines Sur Polytechnic Colleges, popularly known as CSPC. CSPC was the brainchild of some prominent Nabueños who have long dreamt of having a community college in Nabua. Its establishment came into reality as a result of the feasibility study initiated by the defunct Bicol River Basin Development Program (BRBDP). Said undertaking is an inter-agency commitment with the aim of promoting a balance agro-industrial development in the region to achieve the national development goals of the 1980s.
 
The idea of having a community college within Nabua was first conceived by then Municipal Mayor, Atty. Ulpiano D. Duran, Sr. so that poor and deserving Nabueños who wish to take post-secondary and collegiate courses could be freed from the burden of going to other places and save a lot of their education. With the support of his Vice Mayor, Hon. Sofio Barela, Sr. the Sangguniang Bayan passed a resolution for the creation of a community college within the Nabua National High School. Atty. Duran submitted the resolution to then-Governor Felix A. Fuentebella for approval and funding assistance.
 
Considering the merit of the request, Governor Fuentebella endorsed the proposal to BRBDP Director Col. Lorenzo Ballecer, a Nabueño, who then initiated the conduct of the feasibility study by his technical staff with the assistance of some personnel of Nabua National High School. In the course of the study, the team did not only consider the establishment of a community college but also the possibility of putting up a state tertiary institution in the area. As a result of the study conducted, it came out to be very promising if a polytechnic college would be created.

Batas Pambansa 512 
With the very strong representation of his father, Assemblyman Arnulfo P. Fuentebella sponsored a bill creating a polytechnic college of the Nabua National High School using the result of the feasibility as basis, which later became Batas Pambansa (BP) Bilang 512, approved by the President Ferdinand E. Marcos on June 10, 1983.
 
Sec. 2 of BP 512 states that:“The College shall primarily provide higher technological, professional, and vocational instruction and training in fisheries, trades and technology, arts and sciences, as well as short term technical and vocational courses, as the Board of Trustees may deem necessary, and shall promote research in the exploration and conservation of natural resources in the province.”The immediate targets are the graduates of the barangay, private and public high schools, out of school youths and dropouts within Rinconada area, which comprises six municipalities and one city: Nabua, Baao, Bula, Bato, Buhi, Balatan and Iriga City.
 
The first organizational meeting of the college was held on February 22, 1985, at the Provincial Capitol of Camarines Sur. Deputy Minister Vedasto G. Suarez who represented the MECS Minister Jaime C. Laya, presided over the meeting. Government officials present were: Hon. Felix A. Fuentebella, Governor; Atty. Fernando O. Beriña, Provincial Kagawad; Atty. Ulpiano D. Duran Sr., Municipal Mayor; Dir. Carmelo R. Villacorta, BRBDP Director; Dr. Franciscpo Pili, BFAR Director; Dr. Ciriaco N. Divinagracia, CSSAC President; Engr. Aproniano Los Baños, Provincial Engineer; Mr. Constancio Cater, Provincial Administrator; Mr. Germites C. Dineros, NNHS Principal; Atty. Magno Catabijan Sr., MECS Legal Officer; Atty. John Imlan, PASUC Administrative Officer. An Ad Hoc Committee was created headed by Dr. Ciriaco N. Divinagracia, the designated officer in charge. The committee was tasked to prepare the implementing guidelines for the operationalization of the college.
 
During its second organizational meeting on April 1, 1985, the implementing guidelines were approved and Provincial Kagawad Fernando O. Beriña was designated Officer-in-charge. With only eleven (11) personnel; five (5) full-time instructors and six (6) administrative personnel, the college has initially managed to run its affair. A total approximation of Five hundred thousand pesos (P500,000.00) was approved by the Provincial Government of Camarines Sur for the 1985 operation of the college as provided for in BP 512. Thereafter, the operation and maintenance shall be incorporated in the subsequent General Appropriation Act.

Opening 
On May 7, 1985, the college opens its door for enrollment. For the first ten days, it seemed as if the target of 240 students could not be attained. But when enrollment closed on May 27, 1985, the target was overshot by 105 students or a total of 345 students, broken down as follows; One Year Junior Business Machine Certificate, 87; One Year Junior Electrical Certificates, 91; One Year Junior construction Technical Certificate, 80.
 
Having no building of its own to accommodate its enrollees, a small office and six classrooms in the war-damaged building of Nabua National High School were temporarily offered for use after classes, while drafting classes were held at the library.

Appointment and leadership of Dr. Corporal-Seña 
On September 25, 1986, Dr. Lylia Corporal-Seña was appointed as the first President of CSPC. Under her able leadership, she negotiated the temporary use of the Gabaldon Building owned by the Municipal Government of Nabua to accommodate the increasing enrolment. Day class schedules were opened. In the later part of 1986, the college rented a residential house owned by the Regalado Family to house congested offices at the War Damaged Building. This was the first attempt of the college to stand on its feet.
 
Inspired by the strong determination of the leadership of Dr. Seña, a three-classroom building was donated by the Late Engr. Cleto Descalso, a Retired US Navy. This was the first building erected at the swampy – 8 hectares site donated by the Provincial Government of Camarines Sur. In the same year, the Parents Teachers Association initiated the construction of a four-classroom cottage made of Light Local Materials. In the latter part of 1987, classes housed at the War Damaged building were all transferred to the new site. Unfortunately, the cottage lasted only for more than One Year when it was totally destroyed by the Typhoon Sisang.
 
Under the leadership of Dr. Seña, the ladder-type curriculum came in full swing. Altogether, programs on instruction, student activities, administrative concerns, and infrastructure development were given priority. With the end of her term, Mr. Ferdinand B. Valencia became the Officer-in-Charge from March 1, 1993, to May 15, 1997, of the college.

Academic and physical development 
Conscious of the aim and objectives of technical education, improvements of program offered as well as infrastructure developments have been realized. Vital to student's development were clear-out policies for the on-the-job training/ in-company training/ in-house training and affiliation as well as expansion of the scholarship programs on academic, band/ majorettes, publication, athletics, Sangguniang Kabataan and Barangay Scholars to poor but deserving students. Attempts for voluntary accreditation to Accrediting Agency of Chartered Colleges and Universities in the Philippines (AACCUP) have been started.
 
The campus was able to house more classrooms, college library, college museum, audio visual room, information technology building equipped with radio and communication dish satellite, computers, prayer room, chemistry and laboratory room, refrigeration and air conditioning room, machine shop, medical and dental clinics.
 
Construction of the Automotive and Shop Building was completed in 1995. It was followed by the newly constructed multi-purpose stage and landscaping of the campus which contributed much to physical development. Likewise, sports and athletics facilities improved with the construction of volleyball, basketball, and lawn tennis courts, and backfilling of almost one-hectare athletic and NROTC training field. The college library has a total collection of 7,185 volumes of books.

Presidency of Dr. Laniog 
From May 16, 1997, to March 4, 1998, Dr. Lourdes G. Laniog was officer-in-charge of the college and eventually was appointed president on March 5, 1998. She served as president up to May 31, 2002.
 
Through the years, instruction, research and extension have been the focus of her leadership coupled with the hiring of additional teaching and non-teaching personnel, improvements of school facilities particularly the construction of covered court (but collapsed during the onslaught of Typhoon Rosing), construction and completion of Multi-Purpose Building, additional construction of covered walk, upgrading and restructuring of the Laboratory Shop Building, improvement of the water supply system, completion of the IT Building and rehabilitation of the Automotive and Machine Shop Building. Under her leadership, Secretary Raul Roco donated a 2-classroom building and the improvement of the AVR thru the fund assistance from Senator Magsaysay.

Presidency of Dr. Ilarde and Naga Campus 
The third College President, Dr. Monsito G. Ilarde, was appointed on May 27, 2002, but his formal assumption to the presidency was on July 1, 2002.
 
Pursuant to the Special Provision No. 2 of the Commission on Higher Education FY 2002 Budget and CSPC Board of Trustees Resolution No. 00-0044, the Bicol College of Arts and Trades (BCAT) - Naga City was integrated to the college and became CSPC - Naga City Campus.

Presidency of Dr. Atian 
On May 3, 2011, Dr. Dulce Fajardo-Atian was appointed as the fourth College President. She envisioned CSPC as the regional center of excellence in polytechnic education. As such, continuing accreditations of all programs are in place and plans for opening of other curricular programs were considered to attain the goal of a university status. CSPC also embarked to be internationally recognized through its on-going endeavor for ISO accreditation.

Separation of Naga Campus 
On October 19, 2012, President Benigno S. Aquino III signed Republic Act No. 10231, separating CSPC Naga Campus and converting it into Bicol State College of Applied Sciences and Technology (BISCAST).

Polytechnic State University of Bicol 
In 2017, House Bill No. 5119 entitled, “An Act Converting the Camarines Sur Polytechnic Colleges (CSPC) in the Municipality of Nabua, Province of Camarines Sur, into a State University to be known as the Polytechnic State University of Bicol," was filed by Hon. Salvador B. Belaro, Jr. of 1-ANG EDUKASYON Partylist as principal sponsor and Hon. Salvio B. Fortuno, representative of the 5th District of Camarines Sur, as co-sponsor.

On April 12, 2019, President Rodrigo Duterte signed Republic Act 11283, converting CSPC to Polytechnic State University of Bicol.

Presidency of Dr. Cadag 
Following a search, Camarines Sur Polytechnic Colleges’ Board of Trustees named Dr. Charlito P. Cadag as the college's fifth president. Before his presidency, Dr. Cadag was the vice-president for Academic Affairs of Central Bicol State University of Agriculture. His four-year term commenced on July 10, 2019 and will expire on July 9, 2023.

College Presidents

College Seal
The College Seal features four significant figures:

Tower with an inscribed heart
Inscribed Triangle
Flaming fine knots
Inscribed gear in the seal

Academics

Undergraduate Program

College of Computer Studies (CCS)
The College of Computer Studies (CCS), formerly called the College of Information and Communication Technology (CICT), aims to produce globally skilled, ethically upright and socially responsible computing professionals adaptable to technological and social changes, responsive to sustainable development of the region and beyond.

 Bachelor of Science in Information Technology (BSIT)
Bachelor of Science in Computer Science (BSCS)
Bachelor of Library Information Science (BLIS)
Bachelor of Science in Information Systems (BSIS)

College of Engineering (COE)
The College of Engineering aims to provide quality instruction and training in engineering and develop total quality engineers and technology researchers for industry and society

 Bachelor of Science in Civil Engineering (BSCE)
 Bachelor of Science in Mechanical Engineering (BSME)
 Bachelor of Science in Electronics Engineering (BSECE)
 Bachelor of Science in Electrical Engineering (BSEE)

College of Business Management (CBM)
The College of Business Management, formerly called College of Management and Entrepreneurship, aims to produce office administrators and managers in the fields of food service, tourism, and entrepreneurship.

 Bachelor of Science in Office Administration (BSOA)
 Bachelor of Science in Tourism Management (BSTM)
 Bachelor of Science in Entrepreneurial Management (BSEM)
 Bachelor of Science in Hospitality Management (BSHM)

College of Health Sciences (CHS)
The College of Health Sciences, formerly called College of Health Care Technology, aims to produce graduates in the field of midwifery and nursing.

 Bachelor of Science in Nursing (BSN)
 Bachelor of Science in Midwifery

College of Technological and Developmental Education (CTDE)
The College of Technological and Developmental Education aimed to prepare and produce the region’s human resource in technical, vocational, and teacher education who are professionals adhering to the professional, moral and ethical standards equipped with the university core values, competencies, skills, and knowledge to meet the needs and challenges of the society.

 Bachelor of Physical Education (BPEd)
 Bachelor of Culture and Arts(BCAEd)
 Bachelor of Special Needs Education
 Bachelor of Technological Vocational Teacher Education
Major In:
 Fish Processing 
 Food Service Management
 Electronics Technology

College of Arts and Sciences (CAS)
The College of Arts and Sciences (CAS) aims to produce well-rounded individuals who are well equipped with the necessary knowledge and skills in the arts and sciences and competent in their field of specialization so that they will become globally competitive professionals and leaders, and productive citizens of the country.

 Bachelor of Arts in English Language Studies
 Bachelor of Science in Mathematics
 Bachelor of Science in Applied Mathematics
 Bachelor of Science in Development Communication
 Bachelor of Science in Public Administration
 Bachelor in Human Services

Graduate programs
 Master of Arts in Nursing (MAN)
 Master In Business Management (MBM)
 Master of Engineering (M.Eng.)

Student organizations

Academic organizations

College of Engineering 

 Philippine Institute of Civil Engineers (PICE)
 Philippine Society of Mechanical Engineers (PSME)
 Institute of Electronics Engineers of the Philippines (IECEP)
 Institute of Integral Electrical Engineers (IIEE)

College of Health Sciences 

 Primary Health Care Provider (PHCP)
 Philippine Nursing Student Association (PNSA)
 Red Cross Youth Council (RCYC)

College of Computer Studies 

 Junior Philippine Computer Society (JPCS)

College of Business Management 

 Philippine Association of Students in Office Administration (PASOA)
 Culinary and Hospitality Management Association of the Philippines (CHMAP)
 Young Entrepreneurs’ Society (YES)
 Association of Tourism Students (ATS)

College of Arts and Sciences 

 College of Arts and Sciences - College Student Council
 Alliance of Development Communication Students (ADCS)
 League of Elite Math Enthusiasts (LEME)
 Language Studies Society (LSS)
 United League of Public Administration Students (ULPAS)
 Unified Student Association of Human Services (USAHS)

College of Technological and Developmental Education 

 Association of Students in Technical Teacher Education (ASTTE)

Non-Academic Organizations 

 Alliance of Music Passionate Students
 Alpha Phi Omega
 Association of Students in Environmental Awareness and Protection
 Campus Youth Ministry
 College Robotics Club
 Engineering Mathematics and Science Society
 Guild for Upholding and Harnessing Indispensable Talents
 Inter-Varsitarian Christian Fellowship
 Iriga Varsitarian Organization
 Tau Gamma Phi/ Sigma
 Peer Counselors Organization
 Samahang Mag-aaral sa Filipino
 Samahang Magdalo Youth Movement

Academic publications 

The Journal of Education, Management and Development Studies (JEMDS) listed in DOAJ was founded and is published at quarterly frequency.

References

External links 

 Official website

Universities and colleges in Bicol Region
Universities and colleges in Camarines Sur
State universities and colleges in the Philippines